World Series of Poker 2008: Battle for the Bracelets is a video game based on the popular gambling tournament World Series of Poker. It is the sequel to World Series of Poker: Tournament of Champions and is available for the Xbox 360, PlayStation 2, PlayStation 3, PlayStation Portable, Nintendo DS and Microsoft Windows. There are many well-recognized professional poker players in this game, such as Scotty Nguyen, Phil Hellmuth, Chris Ferguson, and Johnny Chan.

Reception

The PC, PlayStation 2 and PlayStation 3 versions received "generally favorable reviews", while the DS and Xbox 360 versions received "mixed or average reviews", according to the review aggregation website Metacritic.

References

External links
 BeatTheBrat.com - The Official World Series of Poker 2008 Video Game
 Activision - World Series of Poker: Battle For The Bracelets
 Left Field Productions
 

2007 video games
Activision games
Left Field Productions games
Nintendo DS games
PlayStation 2 games
PlayStation 3 games
Xbox 360 games
Windows games
PlayStation Portable games
World Series of Poker video games
Poker video games
Video games developed in the United States
Multiplayer and single-player video games